The 1991–92 Scottish Premier Division season was won by Rangers, nine points ahead of Hearts. St Mirren and Dunfermline Athletic were relegated to the 1992–93 First Division.

UEFA gave a third place for the UEFA Cup to Scotland after the disbandment of former East Germany.

Clubs

Stadia and locations

Managers

Managerial changes

League table

Results

Matches 1–22
During matches 1-22 each team plays every other team twice (home and away).

Matches 23–44
During matches 23-44 each team plays every other team twice (home and away).

See also
Nine in a row

References

Scottish Premier Division seasons
Scot
1